Scott M. Mills (born c. 1969) is an American business executive. He is chief executive officer of BET.

Early life

Mills was born around 1969. His mother was a businesswoman and his father was a physician from Long Island, New York. When he was ten years old, Mills realized he wanted to be a businessman. He was inspired by John H. Johnson, whom he calls a hero.

Mills got his early education at the Waldorf School of Garden City, New York. He attended the Wharton School, where he earned a degree in economics.

Career

After graduating college, Mills worked as deputy treasurer for the City of Philadelphia. He eventually became an investment banker. During that time, he got to know Robert L. Johnson, the founder of BET. Eventually, Johnson hired Mills to work at BET. He credited Johnson with teaching him how to operate a business, calling his time with Johnson the "Bob Johnson School of Entrepreneurship".

Mills has a 20 year history of working at Viacom. He was executive vice president and chief administrative officer at Viacom for five years. Prior to that, he was chief operating officer at for BET Networks. During his earlier time at BET, he launched BET's mobile and digital operations and BET Her. Mills became president of BET Networks in December 2017, replacing Debra L. Lee. In November 2021, Mills was named chief executive officer of BET.

Personal life
Mills is married to Iva Mills. They used to live in Bethesda, Maryland.

References

External links
 "BET’s Scott Mills on Providing a Platform" from Multichannel News
 "Encouraged by corporate America’s response to unrest: BET Networks pres." from CNBC

Living people
21st-century American businesspeople
BET Networks
Paramount Global people
Year of birth missing (living people)